The Panasonic Lumix Vario HD 14-140mm 4.0-f/5.8  lens is a kit zoom lens for Micro Four Thirds system cameras.  It was the bundled lens of the GH1, and later GH2, and available for separate purchase.  As these cameras are designed for both still photography and video, the lens has a fast, quiet autofocus motor and a stepless aperture diaphragm, hence the "HD" branding.

External links
 LUMIX G VARIO HD 14-140mm / F4.0-5.8 ASPH. / MEGA O.I.S.

References

14-140
Superzoom lenses
Camera lenses introduced in 2009